The local election for city assembly of Shinagawa, Tokyo, Japan was held on April 15, 2007. The total turnout was 41.59%.

Results

|-
! style="background-color:#E9E9E9;text-align:left;" |Parties
! style="background-color:#E9E9E9;text-align:right;" |Votes
! style="background-color:#E9E9E9;text-align:right;" |%
! style="background-color:#E9E9E9;text-align:right;" |Seats
|-
| style="text-align:left;" |Liberal Democratic Party (自由民主党, Jiyū Minshutō)
| style="text-align:right;" | 26,078.068
| style="text-align:right;" | 
| style="text-align:right;" | 11
|-
| style="text-align:left;" |New Komeito Party (公明党, Kōmeitō)
| style="text-align:right;" | 21,544.887
| style="text-align:right;" | 
| style="text-align:right;" | 8
|-
| style="text-align:left;" |Japanese Communist Party (日本共産党, Nihon Kyōsan-tō)
| style="text-align:right;" | 17,975.874
| style="text-align:right;" | 
| style="text-align:right;" | 7
|-
| style="text-align:left;" |Democratic Party of Japan (民主党, Minshutō)
| style="text-align:right;" | 17,806.445
| style="text-align:right;" | 
| style="text-align:right;" | 5
|-
| style="text-align:left;" |品川・生活者ネットワーク
| style="text-align:right;" | 3,550
| style="text-align:right;" | 
| style="text-align:right;" | 2
|-
| style="text-align:left;" |Social Democratic Party (社民党 Shamin-tō)
| style="text-align:right;" | 1,735
| style="text-align:right;" | 
| style="text-align:right;" | 1
|-
| style="text-align:left;" | Independents
| style="text-align:right;" | 14,531
| style="text-align:right;" | 
| style="text-align:right;" | 6
|-
|style="text-align:left;background-color:#E9E9E9"|Total (turnout 41.59%)
|width="75" style="text-align:right;background-color:#E9E9E9"| N/A
|width="30" style="text-align:right;background-color:#E9E9E9"| 100.00
|width="30" style="text-align:right;background-color:#E9E9E9"| 40
|-
| style="text-align:left;" colspan=4 |Source:
|}

See also

References

Local elections in Japan
Shinagawa
2007 elections in Japan
April 2007 events in Japan
2007 in Tokyo